The omega baryons are a family of subatomic hadron (a baryon) particles that are represented by the symbol  and are either neutral or have a +2, +1 or −1 elementary charge. They are baryons containing no up or down quarks. Omega baryons containing top quarks are not expected to be observed.

The discovery was a great triumph in the study of quark processes, since it was found only after its existence, mass, and decay products had been predicted in 1961 by the American physicist Murray Gell-Mann and, independently, by the Israeli physicist Yuval Ne'eman. The  decays only via the weak interaction and has therefore a relatively long lifetime. Spin (J) and parity (P) values for unobserved baryons are predicted by the quark model.

Since omega baryons do not have any up or down quarks, they all have isospin 0.

Omega baryons

† Particle (or quantity, i.e. spin) has neither been observed nor indicated.

Recent discoveries
The  particle is a "doubly strange" baryon containing two strange quarks and a bottom quark. A discovery of this particle was first claimed in September 2008 by physicists working on the DØ experiment at the Tevatron facility of the Fermi National Accelerator Laboratory. The apparent discrepancy from the Standard Model has since been dubbed the " puzzle". In May 2009, the CDF collaboration made public their results on the search for the  based on analysis of a data sample roughly four times the size of the one used by the DØ experiment. CDF measured the mass to be , which was in excellent agreement with the Standard Model prediction. No signal has been observed at the DØ reported value. In February 2013 the LHCb collaboration published a measurement of the  mass that is consistent with, but more precise than, the CDF result.

The states are named (3000)0, (3050)0, (3066)0, (3090)0 and (3119)0. Their masses and widths were reported, but their quantum numbers could not be determined due to the large background present in the sample.

See also
 Delta baryon
 Hyperon
 Lambda baryon
 List of mesons
 List of particles
 Nucleon
 Physics portal
 Sigma baryon
 Timeline of particle discoveries
 Xi baryon

References

External links
Science Daily – Discovery of the 
Strangeness Minus Three - BBC Horizon 1964 

Baryons